Adeel A. Butt is a Pakistani–American Infectious Diseases physician, Professor of Medicine and Population Health Sciences at the Weill-Cornell Medical College
He is also the founder President and CEO of Innovations in Healthcare Advocacy, Research and Training (I-HART).

Education
Butt obtained his MBBS from The Aga Khan University and then moved to the U.S. to pursue his postgraduate studies. He completed his residency in Internal Medicine at the Mount Sinai School of Medicine affiliated hospitals in New York and then enrolled for fellowship training in Infectious Diseases at the LSU Health Sciences Center New Orleans in New Orleans. He also holds a Certificate in Clinical Research and a Master of Science degree in Clinical Effectiveness and Health Services Research from the University of Pittsburgh School of Medicine in 2006.

Career Highlights
He held the position of Chair of Medicine at Sheikh Khalifa Medical City, Abu Dhabi, UAE (SKMC) subsequently he was appointed as the first Chief Quality Officer(I) at Hamad Medical Corporation (HMC) and the inaugural director of Hamad Healthcare Quality Institute in Qatar. Adeel Butt has provided advice and training to numerous governments, non-governmental organizations, and academic health systems across the globe. He is a member of the Board of Governors in National Institute of Health Pakistan and a member of several advisory committees at the Ministry of Public Health in Qatar. He serves on the Advisory Board of Infectious Diseases Society of America (IDSA) Global Health Taskforce and as Chair of International Advisory Panel for Electronic Health Record (EHR) implementation at the Aga Khan University over 4 countries.  He is also a life member of the Association of Physicians of Pakistani Descent of North America (APPNA), where he has been a pioneer of numerous programs and initiatives.

Research Career
Adeel Butt’s research focus has been hepatitis C virus(HCV) infection and HIV coinfection. He was also involved in National Institutes of Health sponsored AIDS Clinical Trials Network, where he was a member of the Viral Hepatitis Transformative Science Group and led several key clinical trials. More recently his research focus has been on Emerging Infectious Diseases and antimicrobial resistance. in 2018 he led the care and investigation of MERS-CoV outbreaks in the UAE and served as a WHO consultant for this infection. He also led an initiative studying the evolving antimicrobial resistance in the UAE and its impact upon clinical outcomes. More recently, Adeel Butt has been actively involved in the COVID-19 pandemic response and COVID-19 research in Qatar and in the United States and has published more than 70 key papers on this topic.

Academic Appointments
Professor of Medicine at the Weill Cornell Medical College. (2015-present)
Professor of Population Health Sciences at the Weill Cornell Medical College. (2017-present)
Director, Clinical Epidemiology Research unit at the Hamad Medical Corporation, Doha, Qatar. (2016-2021)
Vice Chair, Department of Medicine at the Hamad Medical Corporation, Doha, Qatar. (2014-2021)
Corporate Chief Quality Officer (I) at the Hamad Medical Corporation, Doha, Qatar. (2015-2016)
Director at the Hamad Health Care Quality Institute, Qatar. (2015-2016)
Adjunct Associate Professor of Medicine and Clinical and Translational Sciences at the University of Pittsburgh, Pittsburgh, PA. (2014-2017)
Chief, Division of Infectious Diseases at the Sheikh Khalifa Medical City, UAE. (2012-2014)
Chair, Department of Medicine at the Sheikh Khalifa Medical City, UAE. (2011-2013)
Director, ID and HIV Clinics at the VA Pittsburgh Healthcare System, Pittsburgh, PA. (2001-2011)
Program Director at the International Scholars Program. (2003-2011)
Assistant Professor at the University of University of Pittsburgh School of Medicine. (2002-2008)

Honors
Listed in Stanford List’s World’s Top 2% most influential scientists in 2020 and 2021
Recipient of Pakistan Society of Hepatology Distinguished Academics Award in 2020
Recipient of Best Publication Award, Medical Research Center, Hamad Medical Corporation, Qatar in 2019
Recipient of Hamad Medical Corporation, Qatar, Research Excellence Award in 2018
Recipient of Hamad Medical Corporation Excellence in Health Services Research Award in 2015
Recipient of Abu Dhabi Health Services Company (SEHA) Research Award in 2012
Fulbright Scholar in 2009
National Talent Pool Scholar in 2007
Yale-Johnson & Johnson Scholar in International Health in 2006
Recipient of US Department of State International Education Award in 2006
Recipient of Florida Sea Grant Faculty Award in 2006
Recipient of Career Development Award, NIH/National Institute on Drug Abuse in 2008
Recipient of Outstanding Research Award in 2003

Selected publications
Butt has over 270 research papers in peer reviewed journals. He also has multiple research papers on COVID to his credit.

References 

1967 births
Living people
Physicians
Aga Khan University alumni
American emigrants to Pakistan
American medical writers
American physicians of Pakistani descent
People from Karachi
Academic staff of Aga Khan University
Pakistani medical writers